Bardon Peak is a peak in northeastern Minnesota, USA. It is located inside the southwestern city limits of Duluth, near the Gary – New Duluth neighborhood, and adjacent to Midway Township. The peak is located above the Morgan Park neighborhood. Bardon Peak was named for a James Bardon of nearby Superior, Wisconsin.

According to the city's official map, Bardon's Peak on West Skyline Parkway is located within the boundaries of the Smithville neighborhood.

References

Geography of Duluth, Minnesota
Mountains of Minnesota
Landforms of St. Louis County, Minnesota